The 1902 Cumberland Bulldogs football team represented Cumberland University in the 1902 Southern Intercollegiate Athletic Association football season. The team was a member of the Southern Intercollegiate Athletic Association (SIAA).

Schedule

References

Cumberland
Cumberland Phoenix football seasons
Cumberland Bulldogs football